The 1974 Honduran Segunda División was the eighth season of the Honduran Segunda División.  Under the management of Héctor Bernárdez, C.D. Atlántida won the tournament after defeating Salamar de San Lorenzo in the final series and obtained promotion to the 1975–76 Honduran Liga Nacional.

Final

 Atlántida 3–3 Salamar on aggregate. Atlántida won 6–5 on penalties

References

Segunda
1974